Charles Okechukwu Esimone (born 31 December 1970) is a Nigerian professor of biopharmaceutics and pharmaceutical biotechnology who currently serves as the vice-chancellor of Nnamdi Azikiwe University Awka,  Nigeria. He is the first professor of pharmaceutical microbiology in South-Eastern Nigeria.

Early life and education 
Esimone hails from Akwaeze in Anaocha LGA of Anambra State and was born on 31 December 1970 in Tiko, Cameroon. He attended St Joseph's Primary School Tiko, Cameroon from 1976 to 1982 and proceeded to St. Joseph's College, Sasse, Buea, Cameroon where he acquired his secondary school certificate in 1987. Esimone had another academic tutelage at the Cameroon College of Arts and Science Kumba, Cameroon and obtained a General Certificate in Education (Advanced Level ) in 1989. He obtained Bachelor of Pharmacy (B.Pharm.) in 1995; Master of Pharmacy (M.Pharm.), Pharmaceutical Microbiology in 1998; and Doctor of Philosophy (Ph.D.) in Pharmaceutics in 2002 all from the University of Nigeria Nsukka. Professor Esimone speaks English, French, German and Igbo languages fluently.

Professional career 
Esimone started his career as internee pharmacist and then became a laboratory instructor, all in the Department of Pharmaceutics, University of Nigeria Nsukka. He becomes a professor of biopharmaceutics and pharmaceutical microbiology at the age of 37 years and was the pioneer Dean, Faculty of Pharmaceutical Sciences, Agulu Campus of Nnamdi Azikiwe University Awka. He also served two terms of 2 years as Deputy Vice-Chancellor (Academic) of Nnamdi Azikiwe University, Awka.

He is a researcher with well over 100 publications and in May 2019 was ranked 18th on the list of 28 Most Published Scholars in Nigeria. Prof. Esimone was also the Director of Confucius Institute of Nnamdi Azikiwe  University, Awka. On the 14 of May 2019 he was elected the new Vice Chancellor of Nnamdi Azikiwe University, Awka.

He is the State Campus Coordinator for Deeper Life Campus Fellowship, Anambra State and also a member, BOT (Board of Trustees) of Anchor University, Lagos.

Awards and recognition 
Prof Esimone is a recipient of several awards. They include:

 The Alexander von Humboldt Fellowship to Germany (2003–2005)
 Visiting Scientist to the University of Pittsburgh, (2007–2008)
 The ANDI Bright Contest Award for the Best African Innovative Researcher, South Africa (2009)
 Young Scientist (representing Nigeria) at the "Summer Davos" Annual Meeting of New Champions, Tianjin, China (2010)
 CV Raman Senior Fellowship, India (2013)
Fellow of the Nigerian Academy of Science (2017)
 Member of the Governing Council of the Pharmacists Council of Nigeria, Nnamdi Azikiwe University and the Nanomedicine Society of Nigeria
Pioneer national president of the Nanomedicine Society of Nigeria
Recipient of various national and international grants and a reviewer to several national and international journals.
Member of several professional bodies including the Global Young Academy and the American Society for Cell biology

References

Living people
1970 births
Nigerian academic administrators
Nigerian pharmacists
Nnamdi Azikiwe University alumni
Academic staff of Nnamdi Azikiwe University
Vice-Chancellors of Nigerian universities